Sciadopityaceae, commonly called umbrella pines, is a family of conifers now endemic to Japan. The sole living member of the family is Sciadopitys verticillata, while several several extinct genera are known from the fossil record. Fossils of sciadopityaceous taxa have been described from sediments dating back to the Middle Jurassic. Sciadopitys species are known from the Late Cretaceous of Japan before becoming widespread across Laurasia during most of the Cenozoic, especially in Europe until the Pliocene.

References

Pinales families
Pinales